Ares is the second album by American deathcore band Salt the Wound. It was released on September 15, 2009, through Rotten Records.

Promotion and background
Promoting the release of the album, the band performed at a show in Cleveland at the Grog Shop on August 29, 2009, releasing copies of the album during the show, two weeks before the scheduled release. The song "Take a Bow" is the longest Salt the Wound song ever recorded. The band broke up months after the record's release and reformed nearly a year later with original members following Ares with the release of their third album Kill the Crown.

Track listing

Personnel
Salt the Wound
Matt Wesoly – vocals
Jake Scott – guitar
Vince Stropki – guitar
Brian Martinez – bass guitar
Robert Walters – drums
Production
Cole Martinez – producer, engineer

References

Salt the Wound albums
2009 albums